Herbert, Herb or Bert Welch may refer to:
 Herbert George Welch (1862–1969), American Methodist bishop
 Herbert John Welch (1893–1959), politician in British Columbia, Canada
 Herb Welch (baseball) (1900–1967), backup shortstop in Major League Baseball
 Bert Welch (1912–?), English footballer for Rochdale, see List of Rochdale A.F.C. players (25–99 appearances)
 Herb Welch (born 1961), American football player